The Prussian T 18 was the last class of tank locomotives developed for the Prussian state railways. They were originally intended for services on the island of Rügen as replacements for Class T 12 and T 10 engines. They emerged when a class of locomotive was conceived in 1912 that was to handle express and passenger trains in border areas or in shuttle services on short routes. A tank engine design with symmetrical running gear was envisaged because, unlike a tender locomotive, it could run equally fast forwards and backwards and could be operated on return journeys without having to be turned on a turntable. Its power and top speed were to be the same as those of the P 8. Robert Garbe designed this 4-6-4 (2′C2′) tank locomotive for 100 km/h with a 17-ton axle load and contracted the Vulkan Werke in Stettin to build it. It was given the designation T 18.

A total of 534 engines were built from 1912 to 1927, mainly by the Stettiner Maschinenbau AG Vulcan and, from 1923, also by Henschel, of which 458 alone went to the Prussian state railways and, subsequently, the Deutsche Reichsbahn.

The Reichsbahn took over 460 vehicles from Prussia and 20 from the Royal Württemberg State Railways, incorporating them into DRG Class 78 with operating numbers 78 001–282 and 78 351–528. Of these, number 78 093 came from Alsace-Lorraine and numbers 78 146–165 from Württemberg. Later the engines from the Saar Railway were numbered 78 283 to 78 328 in 1935. and those of the Eutin-Lübeck Railway as 78 329 and 78 330 in 1941.

The Deutsche Bundesbahn took over 424 engines and the Deutsche Reichsbahn in East Germany 53 examples. In 1968 only 35 engines remained with the DR in East Germany. In 1965 the DR fitted the majority of its engines with Giesl chimneys and  Witte smoke deflectors. From 1968 the DB locomotives were reclassified into Class 078; in 1970 the DR regrouped its locomotives into Class 78.1.

The PKP took over some locomotives, classifying them as OKo 1.

The DB converted several Class 78s for push-pull running e.g. between Frankfurt and Wiesbaden. Because the engine driver in the driving coach could only work the brake, operation of the regulator and reversing gear was carried out by specially trained stokers as signalled by the engine driver. The last locomotives were retired by the DB in the mid-1970s at Rottweil locomotive depot (Bahnbetriebswerk or Bw). The farewell journey for this engine class and, at the same time for the Class 38s (Prussian P 8), took place on 31 December 1974. The event was organised by the Zollern Railway Friends. The trip was even reported on the German television channel, ARD.

Particular units 

  was featured in The Great Escape hauling a train made up with Bavarian 3-axle coaches and some newer 2-axle steel coaches. Other scenes depicting the same train were filmed with a DRG Class 86 tank engine.

Preserved Locomotives 

Several T 18 are preserved in museums:
78 009 belongs to the Dresden Transport Museum fleet and is looked after by the IG Bahnbetriebswerk Dresden-Altstadt.
78 189, as OKo 1-3 belongs to the Warsaw Railway Museum in Poland.
78 246 can be viewed at the German Steam Locomotive Museum (Deutschen Dampflokomotiv-Museum).
78 468 (see photograph) belongs to the city of Oberhausen and is operational. It is run by the Emscher Park Eisenbahn Gesellschaft.
78 510 belongs to the DB Museum's collection.

See also 
 Prussian state railways
 List of DRG locomotives and railbuses
 List of Prussian locomotives and railbuses

Notes

References

Further reading 
 
 
 
 
 

Railway locomotives introduced in 1912
4-6-4T locomotives
T 18
Standard gauge locomotives of Germany
Standard gauge locomotives of Poland
2′C2′ h2t locomotives
AG Vulcan Stettin locomotives
Passenger locomotives
Henschel locomotives
Hanomag locomotives
Franco-Belge locomotives